The 2004 Billboard Music Awards were held December 8, 2004 at the MGM Grand Garden Arena in Las Vegas, Nevada. The awards recognized the most popular artists and albums from 2004. Usher is the biggest winner of the night with thirteen awards and then Alicia Keys with seven.

Performances
   
Usher – Burn, My Boo (featuring Alicia Keys)
   
Maroon 5 – This Love
   
Evanescence – My Immortal
   
Jennifer Lopez – I'm Real
   
Beyoncé – Crazy In Love (featuring Jay-Z)
   
Alicia Keys – If I Ain't Got You
   
Hoobastank – The Reason
   
The Black Eyed Peas – Hey Mama, Let's Get It Started

Gwen Stefani – What You Waiting For?/Rich Girl

Winners and nominees
Winners are listed in bold.

Artists with multiple wins and nominations

References

2004
Billboard awards
2004 music awards
2004 in American music
MGM Grand Garden Arena